Bla Cercle is an administrative subdivision of the Ségou Region of Mali. The administrative center (chef-lieu) is the town of Bla.

The cercle is divided into 17 communes:

Beguené
Bla
Diaramana
Diena
Dougouolo
Falo
Fani
Kazangasso
Kemeni
Korodougou
Koulandougou
Niala
Samabogo
Somasso
Tiemena
Touna
Yangasso

References

Cercles of Mali
Ségou Region